Óscar Samuel Ortiz Ascencio (born 14 February 1961) is a Salvadoran politician who served as the Vice President of El Salvador from 1 June 2014 to 1 June 2019. Previously he was the Mayor of Santa Tecla. He was first elected to that position in 2000, and he was re-elected in 2003, 2006, 2009 and 2012.

Ortiz is a member of the Farabundo Martí National Liberation Front (FMLN), the main left-wing party in El Salvador. In 2003 Ortiz lost the party's primary vote to Schafik Hándal by 47% to 53% to decide who would be the party's candidate in the 2004 presidential election. In March 2014, he was elected as vice president alongside the FMLN's presidential candidate, Salvador Sánchez Cerén.

Ortiz was born in San Alejo in 1961. During El Salvador's civil war from 1980 to 1992, Ortiz was a combatant with the Popular Liberation Forces - Farabundo Martí (FPL), one of the five organizations that comprised the FMLN. He was member of parliament for the FMLN from 1994 to 2000. He has been considered one of the most successful Salvadoran mayors for his 13-year-long tenure in Santa Tecla (2000–2013), a post which he left when selected as candidate for the vice presidency in the 2014 presidential election.

References

|-

1961 births
Farabundo Martí National Liberation Front politicians
Mayors of places in El Salvador
Members of the Legislative Assembly of El Salvador
Living people
People from La Unión Department
Vice presidents of El Salvador